Neptune: The Allied Invasion of Europe and the D-Day Landings is a book by Craig L. Symonds published by Oxford University Press in 2014.

Awards
It received the 2015 Samuel Eliot Morison Award for Naval Literature.

References

2014 non-fiction books
Books about World War II
Works about Operation Overlord
Oxford University Press books
Non-fiction books about the United States Navy